These Days is the third and the last studio album by the American rock band Goodness.

Track listing
All songs by Goodness
These Days - 4:10
Sister Twin - 3:17
Sex Rebellion - 3:44
Boy Glory - 4:31
The Waiting Time - 3:41
Disco 77 - 3:36
The River - 3:39
Fall Away - 3:14
One Room - 2:35
Catching Fireflies - 4:50

Personnel
Carrie Akre - vocals
Garth Reeves - guitar, vocals
Chris Friel - drums
Fiia McGann - bass, vocals
Danny Newcomb - guitar

Additional personnel
Mike McCready - guest artist on "Catching Fireflies"
Max Rose - mastering
Barrett Jones - engineer, mixing
John Goodmanson - engineer, mixing, producer

External links
 These Days at Allmusic

1999 albums
Goodness (band) albums
Albums produced by John Goodmanson